Jacob Hersleb Darre (20 November 1757 – 15 December 1841) was a Norwegian vicar. He served as a representative at the Norwegian Constitutional Assembly. 

Jacob Hersleb Darre was born in Overhalla in Nord-Trøndelag, Norway where his father was parish priest. He was a student at the Trondheim Cathedral School from 1776 and graduated cand. theol. from the University of Copenhagen in 1784. He started his career as a  personnel chaplain with his father in Overhalla. In 1792 he became assistant pastor in Orkdal. During the period 1797–1833, he was pastor in Klæbu.

He represented Søndre Trondhjems Amt (now Sør-Trøndelag) at the Norwegian Constitutional Assembly at Eidsvoll in 1814.  At the Assembly, he was joined by fellow delegates Lars Larsen Forsæth and Hans Christian Ulrik Midelfart. At Eidsvoll, all three delegates supported the independence party (selvstendighetspartiet). 

Jacob Darre were married in 1795 with Louise Caroline Steenbuch (1773-1860)  who was the daughter of a parish priest. They were the parents of Hans Jørgen Darre, Bishop of Nidaros diocese. The diary of Jacob Darre, which dated from 1814, was published after his death in 1846.

References

External links
Representantene på Eidsvoll 1814 (Cappelen Damm AS)
 Men of Eidsvoll (eidsvollsmenn)

Related Reading
Holme Jørn (2014) De kom fra alle kanter - Eidsvollsmennene og deres hus  (Oslo: Cappelen Damm) 

1757 births
1841 deaths
People from Overhalla
University of Copenhagen alumni
19th-century Norwegian Lutheran clergy
Fathers of the Constitution of Norway
Norwegian diarists
18th-century diarists
19th-century diarists
18th-century Norwegian Lutheran clergy